Voice of Turkey is the international service of Turkish state radio on shortwave, Turksat 3A satellite and the Internet. All the broadcasts are transmitted from single site near Emirler, Ankara Province..

Current broadcasts

The Voice of Turkey broadcasts 24 hours a day, targeting Turkish nationals living abroad and those of Turkish origin. Its schedule mainly includes news, music, educational and cultural programmes.

Its transmissions start with a piano tune in the hicaz makam.

Languages
The Voice of Turkey broadcasts on a daily basis for a total duration of 58 hours in 27 languages, with each service carrying cultural, music and news programmes:

Arabic
Armenian
Azerbaijani
Bulgarian
Chinese
Dari
English
French
Georgian
German
Hausa
Italian
Japanese
Kazakh
Malay
Pashto
Persian
Russian
Spanish
Swahili
Turkmen
Turkish
Urdu
Uyghur
Uzbek

English language broadcast times

Correct as of 10 April 2021. Shortwave frequencies are listed at the beginning of the broadcast.

 0300-0400 UTC (pre-recorded)
 1630-1730 UTC
 1830-1930 UTC
 2030-2130 UTC
 2200-2300 UTC (pre-recorded)

See also
Turkish Radio and Television Corporation
List of international radio broadcasters

External links

Live Stream

International broadcasters
Radio stations in Turkey
Turkish-language radio stations
Radio stations established in 1937
State media
Turkish Radio and Television Corporation